This was the first edition of the tournament.

Marco Bortolotti and Sergio Martos Gornés won the title after defeating Dustin Brown and Andrea Vavassori 6–4, 3–6, [10–7] in the final.

Seeds

Draw

References

External links
 Main draw

Vesuvio Cup - Doubles